Athinai can refer to:

The English transliteration of Αθήναι , a form of the Greek name for the city of Athens.
SS Athinai (1908), a ship of Greek registry that burned and sank in the Atlantic on 20 September 1915.
SS Athinai (1932), a ship of Greek registry acquired from the Grace Line in 1961 and scrapped in 1989.